Little Airplane Productions is an American television production company co-founded by Josh Selig and Lori Shaer (née Sherman) in 1999. The company produced Oobi for Noggin, Wonder Pets! for Nickelodeon,  and 3rd & Bird for the BBC. It has also released independent short films. Since 2017, the company has been owned by Studio 100, which entered a co-production agreement to create the comedy series Doctor Space with Little Airplane.

The company's main studio is located in New York City's South Street Seaport. Filming, animation, design, and storyboarding work are completed in a  building. The studio also has a recording facility for voice-over and music. In mid-2007, the company opened new studios in London and Abu Dhabi, following the announcement of 3rd & Bird.

Lori Shaer left Little Airplane in 2002, but she continued to be given a "special thanks" credit on the second and third seasons of Oobi. Josh Selig left the company in 2020.

History 

Both Josh Selig and Lori Shaer (named Lori Sherman until her marriage) worked for Sesame Workshop in the mid-1990s. After being laid off, Selig partnered with Shaer to open a studio in New York City. For the first year, they both worked out of a "one-room office in Tribeca" and did not make much money.

Selig explained that they called their payment formula "a third, a third and a third, meaning every time we finished a small production job, we would split whatever profit was left in the budget three ways. Lori got a third. I got a third. And Little Airplane got a third. That first year we both earned less than the guy washing our windows."

The name "Little Airplane" was derived from a 1994 short film that Selig had produced for Sesame Street called "I'm a Little Airplane." At first, Little Airplane only produced similar live-action content, including Oobi and a film called The Time-Out Chair. The studio did not create its own animation until creative director Jennifer Oxley joined the staff. She developed a style of animation called "photo-puppetry" that was used in many of the studio's later works, including Wonder Pets! and 3rd & Bird.

Productions

Television
Oobi was the studio's first show. It starred a cast of bare-hand puppets, led by a boy named Oobi. It premiered on Noggin in 2000. The first season was made up of two-minute shorts, while the second and third seasons were made up of longer episodes spanning 10-13 minutes each.
Wonder Pets! was the studio's second series, focusing on the adventures of three classroom pets. It ran for three seasons. It was originally shown on Nickelodeon, with premieres moved to the separate Nick Jr. Channel during the third season.
3rd & Bird is an animated series co-produced by Little Airplane Productions and CBeebies. The series premiered on CBeebies in July 2008 and aired in 18 territories abroad.
Tobi! is a series of four-minute visual poems that aired on Treehouse TV in Canada. It was distributed by the Paris-based company AWOL Animation.
Small Potatoes debuted at the 12th annual BAMKids International Film Festival. It is currently airing on CBeebies.
The Adventures of Napkin Man! is a series that combines live action and animation. It was created by Selig and Tone Thyne, and it premiered in 2013.
Little Airplane provided English voices and scripts for the first three seasons of Super Wings, an animated series about airplanes co-produced with FunnyFlux Entertainment in South Korea and Alpha Group in China.
The Olive Branch is a series of one-minute stories about two characters who achieve conflict resolution, told without words.
P. King Duckling is a co-production with Uyoung Animation, a Chinese company. The series premiered on Disney Junior on November 7, 2016.
The Dog & Pony Show is an animated series created by Josh Selig and co-produced with RedKnot (a joint venture between Nelvana and Discovery).
 Doctor Space is an upcoming animated comedy series, created and written by Selig and Billy Lopez. It is being co-developed by Little Airplane, Studio 100, and Fantawild. Doctor Space is currently in the development process along with other projects like Fun Town Wheels, Build it Dinos, Mike's Amazing Movers, Butterfly Fairy Friends, and Orion's Belt.

Other
The Time-Out Chair is a short film produced by the studio in 2002. The short was filmed in East Village, Manhattan and shown at the 2003 Tribeca Film Festival.
Linny the Guinea Pig is a collection of two short films about a guinea pig who embarks on adventures. The shorts, which inspired the Wonder Pets! show, were aired on Nickelodeon in 2003.
Little Airplane produced the animation for a segment called "Son of Man" for the 2006 Broadway production of Tarzan.
Little Airplane produced a series of PSA commercials for the YMCA of Greater New York in 2010.
A Laurie Berkner Christmas, an album by Laurie Berkner, was recorded and mixed by Little Airplane Productions in 2012.
The Jo B. & G. Raff Show! was a television pilot for Amazon Studios that Little Airplane produced in 2014.

Other work

Cancelled projects
The Wonder Pets! episode "Kalamazoo!" was intended to be a backdoor pilot for a spin-off series, centering on the character Ming-Ming and her brother Marvin. Selig pitched the spin-off to Nickelodeon after the final season of Wonder Pets! wrapped, but Nickelodeon did not pick up the spin-off or any additional episodes of the series.

In 2008, Sesame Workshop hired Little Airplane to "produce a bible for a series in development," but the project did not materialize.

The Little Light Foundation
In 2009, Little Airplane Productions created a non-profit initiative called "The Little Light Foundation." The Foundation's first project was the animated series The Olive Branch for Nick Jr.

The Little Airplane Café
In the summer of 2009, Little Airplane Productions launched the Little Airplane Café. Laurie Berkner opened the restaurant in July 2009. Her performance was broadcast live on SiriusXM. Guests have included Jon Scieszka, Milkshake, and Suzi Shelton.

The Little Airplane Academy
Little Airplane Academy offers a three-day workshop twice a year at the company's South Street Seaport studios.  Participants learn the fundamentals of creating a preschool series including pitching, writing, character design, directing and producing live action and animated shows. In 2009, the Academy ran a one-day writing workshop with Susan Kim. Little Airplane has also hosted workshops in Qatar, England, and Norway.

References

External links

Mass media companies established in 1999
American animation studios
1999 establishments in New York (state)